The 2021–22 Stephen F. Austin Ladyjacks basketball team will represent Stephen F. Austin University during the 2021–22 NCAA Division I women's basketball season. The Ladyjacks are led by seventh year head coach Mark Kellogg and play their home games at the William R. Johnson Coliseum as members of the Western Athletic Conference.

This season is the Ladyjacks' first as members of the Western Athletic Conference. Stephen F. Austin is one of four schools, all from Texas, that left the Southland Conference in July 2021 to join the WAC.[1]

Previous season

Roster

Schedule
Sources:

|-
!colspan=9 style=| Non-conference regular season

|-
!colspan=9 style=| WAC Conference season

|-
!colspan=9 style=|WAC Tournament

|-
!colspan=9 style=|NCAA Tournament

See also
2021–22 Stephen F. Austin Lumberjacks basketball team

References

Stephen F. Austin Ladyjacks basketball seasons
Stephen F. Austin
Stephen F. Austin
Stephen F. Austin Ladyjacks basketball
Stephen F. Austin Ladyjacks basketball